Yle or YLE may also refer to:

Cambridge YLE
Yle, the Finland's national public-broadcasting company
Yle TV1
Yle TV2
Yle Teema
Yle Fem
Yle Uutiset
YLE Extra
Yle Radio Suomi
Yle Nyheter
Yle X3M
Yle Sámi Radio
Yle Nyheter
Yle Vega
Turku Yle Radio Mast

Other uses
 Yle, a colloquial vulgarism for the penis in Georgian language